Ephutomorpha is a genus of parasitoid wasp in the family Mutillidae.

Defenses
Many members of this genus exhibit aposematic coloration. Ephutomorpha ruficornis is believed to use Müllerian mimicry by mimicking the colorations of Fabriogenia species.

Species

 E. aciculata
 E. adjacens
 E. adjuncta
 E. aciculata
 E. aenea
 E. aeneifrons
 E. aeneiventris
 E. alata
 E. albocaudata
 E. albosignata
 E. amoena
 E. amoenula
 E. anchorites
 E. assimilis
 E. associata
 E. atroaenea
 E. atrovirens
 E. aurata
 E. auricrucis
 E. aurigera
 E. aurovestita
 E. australasiae
 E. bicolorata
 E. bilobata
 E. bipartita
 E. biplagiata
 E. bivulnerata
 E. blanda
 E. brachynota
 E. burkei
 E. caeruleiceps
 E. caliginosa
 E. carbonaria
 E. castaneiventris
 E. chalconota
 E. chalcosoma
 E. chrysochlora
 E. cockerelli
 E. cocytia
 E. comes
 E. condonensis
 E. confraterna
 E. contigua
 E. cordatiformis
 E. corusca
 E. cyaneidorsis
 E. cyanescens
 E. darwiniana
 E. dentifrons
 E. dentipes
 E. depressa
 E. diaphanopyga
 E. distinguenda
 E. diversipes
 E. edmondi
 E. egena
 E. elderi
 E. elegans
 E. emeraldiana
 E. excerpta
 E. fabricii
 E. fallax
 E. ferruginata
 E. formicaria
 E. fragilis
 E. froggatti
 E. fulvescens
 E. fulvocrinita
 E. fulvodorsalis
 E. germana
 E. gilesi
 E. gondennda
 E. haematogastra
 E. henrici
 E. hirtella
 E. hospes
 E. illustris
 E. impressiventris
 E. interjecta
 E. jucunda
 E. labeculata
 E. laetabilis
 E. lamellifrons
 E. lateralis
 E. latidentata
 E. lauta
 E. lineithorax
 E. liopyga
 E. lurida
 E. lutaria
 E. mackayensis
 E. macracantha
 E. maculata
 E. maculiventris
 E. melanaderia
 E. meranoploides
 E. mimula
 E. minuscula
 E. mira
 E. misera
 E. morosa
 E. mutabilis
 E. nepheloptera
 E. nigrociliata
 E. nigroviridis
 E. obscuriceps
 E. orphea
 E. oviventris
 E. pallidicornis
 E. pallidiventris
 E. parca
 E. peremeraldiana
 E. picta
 E. placens
 E. porrecticeps
 E. postica
 E. princeps
 E. pulchella
 E. quadriceps
 E. quadrisignata
 E. rectanguliceps
 E. redanamelia
 E. rubella
 E. rubromaculata
 E. rubropetiolata
 E. ruficornis
 E. rufomixta
 E. rugidorsis
 E. sagittifera
 E. sanguineiceps
 E. scabrosa
 E. scabrosiformis
 E. scandens
 E. scrutata
 E. scutifrons
 E. semicyanea
 E. senilis
 E. setigera
 E. sosiana
 E. subcristata
 E. subelegans
 E. trifimbriata
 E. trilineata
 E. turneri
 E. umbrosa
 E. uniformis
 E. variabilis
 E. varipes
 E. venusta
 E. viridiaenea
 E. viridiceps
 E. virulenta
 E. vittigera
 E. vivida
 E. volubilis

References 

Apocrita
Mutillidae